General Lauri Johannes Sutela (11 October 1918, Äänekoski – 8 November 2011; surname until 1929 Schroderus) was a Finnish military officer. He served as an officer in the engineer corps during World War II.

Sutela worked his way up the Finnish Army and finally became the Chief of Defence from 15 April 1974 until 11 October 1983. His appointment was controversial since he was the first (and last) non-combat arms officer to be appointed as the Chief of Defence, but he was appointed solely on the basis of seniority. He was considered to be acceptable and a consensus candidate to both Sweden, Soviet Union, West Germany and East Germany, i.e. the main foreign players with influence in the Finnish defence establishment. As a Staff Colonel in the early-to-mid 1960s, he had authored several books on doctrine and tactics on how to adapt Soviet weapons systems to Western/Finnish doctrine and tactics.

Death
Sutela died in Helsinki, Finland on 8 November 2011 at the age of 93. He is buried in the Hietaniemi Cemetery in Helsinki.

References

1918 births
2011 deaths
People from Äänekoski
Chiefs of Staff (Finnish Defence Forces)
Finnish generals
Finnish military personnel of World War II
Burials at Hietaniemi Cemetery